"Someone" is a song by English musician Lucy Spraggan. The song was released in the United Kingdom as a digital download on 17 September 2012. The song is included on an album called Local Talent which features 56 local UK artists including Lucy. The song peaked to number 137 on the UK Singles Chart and number 16 on the UK Indie Chart.

Track listing

Chart performance

Release history

References

2012 songs
Lucy Spraggan songs